Theodoros Chiritrantas (born 10 November 2000) is a Greek professional footballer who plays as a winger for Super League 2 club Iraklis.

References

2000 births
Living people
Greek footballers
Super League Greece 2 players
Super League Greece players
Football League (Greece) players
Gamma Ethniki players
Agrotikos Asteras F.C. players
Apollon Smyrnis F.C. players
GAS Ialysos 1948 F.C. players
Trikala F.C. players
Iraklis Thessaloniki F.C. players
Association football wingers
Footballers from Thessaloniki